33rd edition of the tournament, 5-time champions Al-Shabab SC are the former champions. Originally the league would consist of 7 teams but with the Kuwait FA announced its expansion in football so last seasons 2017–18 relegated team have been un-relegated and 2017–18 Kuwaiti Division One winners Al-Shabab SC and losing play-off team Al-Fahaheel FC will all compete this season. So moving forward any new team to be founded and join football would join the Kuwaiti Division One.

Teams

Lists of teams and locations

Personnel and sponsorship

References

External links
Kuwait League Fixtures and Results at FIFA
Kuwaiti Premier League (Arabic)
xscores.com Kuwait Premier League
goalzz.com - Kuwaiti League
RSSSF.com - Kuwait - List of Champions

Kuwaiti Division One seasons
Premier League
Kuwaiti Kuwaiti Division One